The 2010 Thai FA Cup Final was the 17th final of the Thailand's domestic football cup competition, the FA Cup. The final was played at Suphachalasai Stadium in Bangkok on 28 November 2010. The match was contested by Muangthong United, who beat Rajnavy Rayong 1–0 in their semi-final, and Chonburi who beat Royal Thai Army 2–0 in the match. After Therdsak Chaiman opened the scoring in 44th minute, Datsakorn Thonglao equalised in the 59th minute before the draw and Chonburi beat Muangthong United at the extra time 2–1 by Pipob On-Mo.

Road to the final

Note: In all results below, the score of the finalist is given first (H: home; A: away; TPL: Clubs from Thai Premier League; D1: Clubs from Thai Division 1 League; D2: Clubs from Regional League Division 2).

Match

Details

Assistant referees:
 Thaweep Inkaew
 Surasak Kundiloksirodom
Fourth official:
 Prathan Nasawang
Match Rules
90 minutes.
30 minutes of extra-time if necessary.
Penalty shootout if scores still level.
Nine named substitutes
Maximum of 3 substitutions.

2010
1